Patrick or Pat Lennon may refer to:
Patrick Lennon (baseball), baseball player
Patrick Lennon (bishop) (1914–1990), Bishop of Kildare and Leighlin
Pat Lennon, musician in Venice
Pat Lennon (hurler) (born 1932), Irish hurler